The 1992 match between former world chess champions Bobby Fischer and Boris Spassky was billed as a World Chess Championship, but was unofficial.  It was a rematch of the 1972 World Championship match. Fischer won 10–5, with 15 draws.

The match was played in late 1992 in Federal Republic of Yugoslavia, which was under UN sports sanctions because of the breakup of Yugoslavia. The United States issued a warrant for Fischer's arrest, and he never returned to his home country.

Although there was substantial media coverage, and some drama, public interest in the historic Fischer–Spassky rematch was not nearly as great as the 1972 encounter in Reykjavík, Iceland.

Background
After defeating Spassky to win the title of World Champion in the World Chess Championship 1972, Fischer was scheduled to defend his title in 1975 against the winner of the 1974 FIDE Candidates Tournament, Anatoly Karpov. Fischer, however, was unhappy with the format of the World Championship. At the time the format was a 24-game match, with the winner being the first player to score 12½ points; if the match was drawn 12–12, then the match would be stopped, the prize money split, and the Champion retained his title. Fischer disliked this format because the player who was leading could play to draw games instead of win, and with each drawn game coast closer to the title. In his match against Spassky in 1972, games 14 to 20 were all draws. This style of chess offended Fischer. Instead, Fischer demanded the format be changed to that used in the very first World Championship, between Wilhelm Steinitz and Johannes Zukertort, where the winner was the first player to score 10 wins with draws not counting. In case of a 9–9 score, the champion would retain title, and the prize fund split equally. A FIDE Congress was held in 1974 during the Nice Olympiad. The delegates voted in favor of Fischer's 10-win proposal, but rejected the 9–9 clause as well as the possibility of an unlimited match. In response, Fischer refused to defend his title, and Karpov was declared World Champion by forfeit.

Seventeen years later, Fischer entered negotiations with sponsors willing to fund a match under his proposed format, settling on a bid from Yugoslav millionaire Jezdimir Vasiljević. Fischer insisted that since he had not been defeated in a match, he was still the true World Champion. He further claimed that all the games in the FIDE-sanctioned World Championship matches, involving Karpov and his challengers Korchnoi and Kasparov, had prearranged outcomes. He then played a rematch of the 1972 World Chess Championship against Spassky. The purse for the rematch was US$5 million, with $3.35 million of the purse to go to the winner.

Match

The match started in Sveti Stefan near Budva, an island off the coast of Montenegro. The match rules required a player to win ten games (draws not counting), with no . After a player had won five games, the match would take a 10-day recess and continue in Belgrade, the capital of Serbia.

Spassky at the time was rated 2560, (tied for 96th–102nd on the FIDE rating list at the time), well below World Champion and world number one Garry Kasparov, who was rated 2790. Fischer's score of 17½ out of 30 (counting draws) against Spassky gave him a performance rating of 2660, which would have put him at No. 10 in the world on the January 1993 list.

Yasser Seirawan believed that the match proved that Fischer's playing strength was "somewhere in the top ten in the world". Kasparov himself was dismissive of Fischer, stating that "Bobby is playing OK, nothing more. Maybe his strength is 2600 or 2650. It wouldn't be close between us." Jeremy Silman wrote that Fischer's level of play was inconsistent: Games 1 and 11 were very highly regarded, but overall the level of play was below that of the world championship matches of Kasparov.

Aftermath

After Fischer's victory, he proclaimed himself as the "Undefeated Champion of the World". His status as a World Champion in 1992 is not widely acknowledged.

Both match locations were at the time part of the same country, the Federal Republic of Yugoslavia, which was under UN sports sanctions because of the breakup of Yugoslavia. Fischer's participation led to a conflict with the US government, which warned Fischer that his participation in the match would violate an executive order imposing US sanctions on Yugoslavia. The US government ultimately issued a warrant for his arrest. After that, Fischer lived his life as an émigré.

Fischer never played competitively again after this match, and died in 2008.

For Spassky, this match proved to be his last major challenge. He continued to play occasional events, but never participated in a world championship cycle again.

Games

Sveti Stefan venue

Game 1: Fischer–Spassky, 1–0 (Ruy Lopez Breyer) 

September 2. 19.b4 was Fischer's  preventing ...Nc5. After 22.Ra3 Fischer had the upper hand.

Game 2: Spassky–Fischer, ½–½ (King's Indian Sämisch) 

September 3. If 15.f5 then 15...g5! After 17...f6! the game was even (Krnić).

Game 3: Fischer–Spassky, ½–½ (Ruy Lopez Breyer) 

September 5. After 23...Rc8 Spassky was slightly better.

Game 4: Spassky–Fischer, 1–0 (QGA Classical) 

September 6. After 13.Nd4! Rc8 the game was even (Krnić).

Game 5: Fischer–Spassky, 0–1 (Ruy Lopez Breyer) 

September 9. After 22...b4 the position was unclear (Chandler).

Game 6: Spassky–Fischer, ½–½ (QGA Classical) 

September 10. A better line for Fischer would have been 16...Bb4 17.Ndf3! a5! 18.Nc6+ Bxc6 19.Rxc6 Rc8 20.Nd4 with a slight plus for Spassky (Seirawan).

Game 7: Fischer–Spassky, 1–0 (Ruy Lopez Zaitsev) 

September 12. After 17...c4! 18.b4! cxd3 19.Bxd3 Qxd5 20.Be4 Nxe4 (only move) 21.Nxe4 Bg7 22.bxa5 f5 23.Ng3 e4 24.Nh4 Bf6? 25.Nxg6 e3 26.Nf4 Qxd2 27.Rxe3 Qxd1+ 28.Rxd1 Fischer had a decisive advantage (Matanović). If instead 20...Qc4, 21.Qb1! (Fischer) Nc6 22.Bxg6 fxg6 23.Qxg6+ Bg7 24.Nf5 and White wins.

Game 8: Spassky–Fischer, 0–1 (KID Sämisch Panno) 

September 13. After 15...Be6! 16.Kb1! Ne8 Spassky had a slight advantage (Krnić).

Game 9: Fischer–Spassky, 1–0 (Ruy Lopez Exchange) 

September 16. After 17...Kc6 18.axb6 cxb6 19.Nbxc5! Fischer had a decisive advantage (Matanović).

Game 10: Spassky–Fischer, ½–½ (Nimzo-Indian Classical) 

September 19. After 18.Bb5? (18.Qxa5 Nxa5 19.Rb5 Nc6 20.h4! was better) Qxd2+ 19.Kxd2 Bd7 Fischer had a slight advantage (Krnić).

Game 11: Fischer–Spassky, 1–0 (Sicilian Rossolimo) 

September 20. Fischer innovates with a tactical gambit 7.b4 Spassky could have evened the game with 13...Ne7 (Timman).

Belgrade venue

Game 12: Spassky–Fischer, 1–0 (KID Sämisch Panno) 

September 30. Instead of 15...c5, better for Fischer was 15...c6 16.Qb3 and White has a slight advantage (Balasov).

Game 13: Fischer–Spassky, ½–½ (Sicilian Rossolimo) 

October 1. Fischer could have kept a slight edge with 14.Qxa6 Bxa6 15.Na5! Rfc8 16.Be3 Rab8 17.b3 f5 18.exf5 gxf5 19.Rac1 (Matulović).

Game 14: Spassky–Fischer, ½–½ (QGA Classical) 

October 3. After 19...Rc7 the game was even (Damljanović).

Game 15: Fischer–Spassky, ½–½ (Catalan Closed) 

October 4. After 19.f3 the game was even.

Game 16: Spassky–Fischer, 0–1 (King's Indian) 

October 7. The players reached a Benoni Defense (ECO A56) after 5...Bg7, which transposed to a King's Indian Defence after 6.Bg5. Spassky should have played 9.Qd2 Nh5 10.Be2 Nxg3 11.hxg3 a6 12.Nf3 Nd7 13.0-0 Rb8 14.a4 with a slight advantage for White (Minev).

Game 17: Fischer–Spassky, 1–0 (Sicilian Closed) 

October 10. Spassky had the possibility 16...Qe7!? 17.Qd1 Re8 18.Qf3 Bc8 with an even game (Matanović).

Game 18: Spassky–Fischer, ½–½ (QGA Classical) 

October 11. After 20.Na5 Spassky had a slight edge.

Game 19: Fischer–Spassky, ½–½ (Sicilian Closed) 

October 14. Instead of 14.Rb1, 14.f5 would have yielded a slight edge to Fischer (Matanović).

Game 20: Spassky–Fischer, 1–0 (Sicilian Closed) 

October 15. After 14.g4 Spassky had a slight edge (Acers, Ciamara).

Game 21: Fischer–Spassky, 1–0 (Sicilian Taimanov) 

October 17. After 16.Qd2, Fischer had a slight advantage.

Game 22: Spassky–Fischer, ½–½ (Sicilian Closed) 

October 18. After 18...Nc7 the game was even.

Game 23: Fischer–Spassky, ½–½ (Sicilian Closed) 

October 21. After 19...Be6 the game was even.

Game 24: Spassky–Fischer, ½–½ (Sicilian Dragon) 

October 24. After 14...Kh7 the game was even.

Game 25: Fischer–Spassky, 1–0 (Sicilian Scheveningen) 

October 28.

Game 26: Spassky–Fischer, 1–0 (King's Indian) 

October 29. The players reached a Benoni Defense (ECO A56) after 6.Bd3, which transposed to a King's Indian Defence after 7.Nf3. After 16.g4! Spassky had a slight edge (Krnić).

Game 27:  Fischer–Spassky, ½–½ (Ruy Lopez Exchange) 

October 31. If 14.b3 instead (to prevent 14...Nc4), then either 14...Bd6 or 14...c4 15.f3 give a level game (Balashov).

Game 28: Spassky–Fischer, ½–½ (KID Sämisch Panno) 

November 1. After 15.0-0-0 Spassky had a slight advantage.

Game 29: Fischer–Spassky, ½–½ (Ruy Lopez Breyer) 

November 4. After 22...Nb6, Spassky had a slight advantage.

Game 30: Spassky–Fischer, 0–1 (KID Sämisch Panno) 

November 5. After 13.g4? (13.Qd2!?) hxg4! 14.fxg4 c5 15.h5 cxd4 16.Nd4 Nc5! Fischer had the upper hand (Krnić).

See also
World Chess Championship 1972

References

Bibliography

Further reading

1992 in chess
Budva Municipality
Sport in Belgrade
Chess competitions
1992 in Serbian sport
1992 in Montenegro
Chess rivalries
Politics and sports
Bobby Fischer